The Egerton, later Grey Egerton, later still Egerton baronetcy, of Egerton and Oulton in the county of Chester, is a title in the Baronetage of England held by the senior patrilineal branch of the Egerton family.

One of the earliest English baronetcies created, Sir Roland Egerton left many male descendants in remainder to his title.

History

Background
The baronetcy was created on 5 April 1617 for Sir Roland Egerton, whose family were established by the 13th century in Cheshire. The Anglo-Norman chevalier David le Clerc de Malpas migrated to England, and was appointed justice for Cheshire by King Henry III in 1252. Le Clerc held three knights' fees for the county, owing the King their service as and when summoned to war. His second son named Philip le Goch (translated from the brythonic as 'the Red') was lord of the manor of Egerton, Cheshire.

The late 15th-century head of the family, Philip Egerton of Egerton, married Margery, daughter of Sir William Mainwaring; he died in 1474 at the height of the civil strife, leaving a number of sons: the second was Sir Ralph Egerton of Ridley, whose illegitimate son by a concubine, Alice Sparks, was Thomas Egerton, created Viscount Brackley after rising to high office in the Elizabethan court (see Earls and Dukes of Bridgewater). Their elder son, John Egerton of Egerton (died 1483), married Elizabeth, daughter and heir of Hugh Done of Oulton, and paternal granddaughter of James Touchet, Lord Audley.  Their only son was Philip Egerton of Egerton and Oulton (died 1534), who married Joan, a widow of Sir Richard Winnington and daughter and coheir of Gilbert Smith of Cuerdley, Lancashire, leaving only one son:  Sir Philip (died 1563) who married Eleanor, daughter of Sir Randle Brereton, of Malpas; their eldest son was John Egerton (died 1590) married Jane, daughter of Sir Piers Mostyn, whose eldest son was Sir John Egerton.

Egerton baronetcy 
Sir Roland's parents were Sir John Egerton of Egerton and Oulton (1551-1614) by his first wife Margaret Stanley, daughter of Sir Rowland Stanley, of Hooton; they left eleven children. Sir Roland later represented Wootton Bassett in Parliament. Egerton married Bridget, sister and co-heir of Thomas, 15th Baron Grey de Wilton, who was attainted in 1603 forfeiting his title (see Baron Grey de Wilton). The Egertons were ancient Cheshire landowners: an ancestor of the first baronet, William le Belward, took the surname of Egerton from the lordship of Egerton, which he inherited. 

The 6th Baronet sat as Member of Parliament for Newton. The 7th Baronet was revived as Baron Grey de Wilton, a title held by his ancestors to which he was in remainder, his peerage title was created with remainder to his heirs male.  In 1801 he was elevated as Viscount Grey de Wilton and Earl of Wilton, of Wilton Castle in the County of Hereford, in the Peerage of the United Kingdom. These titles were created with special remainder to the second and the younger sons successively of his daughter Lady Eleanor Egerton, who married Robert Grosvenor thereby becoming Marchioness of Westminster. 
 
On Lord Wilton's death in 1814 the barony became extinct as he had no sons, while he was succeeded in the viscountcy and earldom according to the special remainder by his grandson Thomas Grosvenor (1799–1882), who adopted the surname of Egerton becoming the second Earl, later passing on the title to his descendants. The baronetcy devolved to his kinsman, Sir John Grey Egerton as 8th Baronet, a descendant of a younger son of the first baronet; he represented Chester in the House of Commons. In 1825 the 9th Baronet was granted by Royal Licence that all subsequent baronets upon succeeding to the title, could assume for themselves only the additional surname of Grey and the arms and supporters of Grey de Wilton. The 10th Baronet, Sir Philip, was a politician and noted palaeontologist. The 16th baronet was a major general in the British Army who inherited the baronetcy at the age of 94; General Egerton opted not to use the customary style of Sir (nor the additional surname of Grey). As of 2016, the title is held by his son Sir William Egerton, the 17th Baronet, who succeeded in 2010.

Notable family members
Several other members of this branch of the Egerton family have also gained distinction. Major-General Caledon Richard Egerton, fifth son of the ninth baronet, served as a General in the British Army. His third son, Sir Charles Egerton, became a Field Marshal in the British Army, whose son Vice-Admiral Wion de Malpas Egerton, Royal Navy (1879–1943), was killed in action during the Second World War; his son Sir David Egerton (1914–2010), a Major-General late Royal Artillery, who was awarded the Military Cross before succeeding as the 16th baronet in 2008.

Sir Reginald Arthur Egerton, another son of the aforementioned Major-General Caledon Egerton (died 1930), was Private Secretary to the Postmaster-General, Surveyor to the General Post Office, London, and Secretary-General to the GPO, Dublin. Sir Stephen Loftus Egerton (1932–2006) (son of William le Belward Egerton, son of William Egerton, son of Philip Henry Egerton, son of William Egerton, third son of Philip Egerton, father of the eighth and ninth Baronets), was a prominent diplomat; he served as HM Ambassador to Iraq from 1980 to 1982 and Ambassador to Saudi Arabia from 1986 to 1989.

Sir Robert Eyles Egerton (1827–1912), youngest son of William Egerton, third son of Philip Egerton, father of the eighth and ninth Baronets, was Lieutenant-Governor of the Punjab. His son Sir Raleigh Gilbert Egerton (1860–1931) was a Lieutenant-General in the British Army. A cadet branch of the family is settled in Australia (see Peter Egerton Warburton): one of the present-day members of the family, Richard Egerton-Warburton AO LVO, while another branch runs the Mount Barker winery in Western Australia.

Egerton, later Grey Egerton baronets, of Egerton and Oulton (1617)
 Sir Roland Egerton, 1st Baronet (died 1646)
 Sir John Egerton, 2nd Baronet (died 1674)
 Sir John Egerton, 3rd Baronet (c. 1658 – 1729)
 Sir Holland Egerton, 4th Baronet (c. 1689 – 1730)
 Sir Edward Egerton, 5th Baronet (c. 1719 – 1744)
 Sir Thomas Grey Egerton, 6th Baronet (c. 1721 – 1756)
 Sir Thomas Grey Egerton, 7th Baronet (1749–1814) (created Earl of Wilton in 1801);

Earls of Wilton (1801)
 Thomas Egerton, 1st Earl of Wilton (1749–1814): succeeded as Earl of Wilton, according to the special remainder, by his grandson Thomas Grosvenor (1799–1882):
 see Earl of Wilton;

Grey Egerton baronets, of Egerton and Oulton (1617; reverted)

 Sir John Grey Egerton, 8th Baronet (1766–1825)
 Sir Philip Grey Egerton, 9th Baronet (1767–1829)
 Sir Philip de Malpas Grey Egerton, 10th Baronet (1806–1881)
 Sir Philip le Belward Grey Egerton, 11th Baronet (1833–1891)
 Sir Philip Henry Brian Grey-Egerton, 12th Baronet (1864–1937)
 Sir Brooke de Malpas Grey Egerton, 13th Baronet (1845–1945)
 Sir Philip Reginald le Belward Grey Egerton, 14th Baronet (1885–1962)
 Sir (Philip) John Caledon Grey Egerton, 15th Baronet (1920–2008)
 General Sir David Boswell Egerton, 16th Baronet (1914–2010)
 Sir William de Malpas Egerton, 17th Baronet (born 1949);
 the heir apparent is his son Matthew Robert Egerton (born 1977).

See also
 Egerton family
 Baron Grey de Wilton
 Earl of Wilton

Notes

Bibliography 

 Brief biography of Sir Reginald Arthur Egerton

External links
 The Guardian obituary of Sir Stephen Egerton
 The Daily Telegraph obituary of Maj-Gen. Sir David Egerton, Bt
 Burke's Peerage & Baronetage

 

English families
Egerton family
1617 establishments in England
Noble families of the United Kingdom
Baronetcies in the Baronetage of England
Egerton